Hu Tu Tu is a 1999 Indian Hindi-language drama film directed by Gulzar, starring Nana Patekar, Sunil Shetty, Tabu and Suhasini Mulay.

Plot
The story opens with the kidnapping of Panna Barve (Tabu), the daughter of Chief Minister Malti Barve (Suhasini Mulay). The responsible gang's demand is that one of their members be released from police custody. While in captivity, Panna reminisces about her childhood, where she had to struggle to grow up with a power hungry and inconsiderate mother and a simple, quiet, and spineless father (Shivaji Satam). Panna's mother had also been carrying on a rather open affair with party co-member Sawantrao Gadre (Mohan Agashe). Flashback over and Panna soon meets the man behind her kidnapping Aditya (Sunil Shetty) who Panna knows from before.

Via second flashback, we learn that Panna and "Adi" were lovers once upon a time. Their closeness stemmed from the fact that he also was struggling with a corrupt parent in the form of businessman father, P.N. Patel (Kulbhushan Kharbanda). Panna and Adi both find solace in a poor basti with the company of Adi's old teacher Joshi Master and in the philosophy of poet Bhau (Nana Patekar), much to the dismay of the couple's respective parents. Bhau even goes to the extent of becoming Malti's most vociferous opponent. Due to a sudden car accident, however, Adi is presumed dead and Panna loses Adi's out-of-wedlock baby before it can be born. Thus ends the second flashback.

Getting back to the kidnapping, Adi and Panna reunite after quite some time. They talk to each other and piece together the events that have occurred since their separation. Just then, the missing gang member is sent back to Adi. It is none other than Bhau, who is returned to the gang with his brain destroyed by electric shock. News also comes that Joshi Master is killed in jail and it is portrayed as a suicide. Panna and Adi then decide what the best form of poetic justice will be for their parents. They both sneak into an election campaign of Malti Barve and P.N. Patel, and explode bombs attached to them, thus destroying everything. The film ends with Panna's father working as headmaster in a school.

Gulzar suggests that although we have already ruined the world for Generation X, we should focus our efforts into the protection and education of our school children. If we shield them from this corruption, they will become the leaders of tomorrow, and they will run the country the way it should be.

Cast
 Nana Patekar as Bhau
 Sunil Shetty as Aditya Patel (Adi)
 Tabu as Panna Barve
 Suhasini Mulay as Maltibai Barve
 Shivaji Satam as Barve
 Mohan Agashe as Sawantrao Gadre
 Kulbhushan Kharbanda as P.N. Patel
 Raj Zutshi as Arun Barve
 Gracy Singh as Shanti
 Ajit Vachani as Police Commissioner J.D.
 Rajesh Khera

Soundtrack
Music by Vishal Bhardwaj.
"Itna Lamba Kash Lo Yaaro" - Lata Mangeshkar, Hariharan
"Bandobast Hai, Jabardast Hai" - Roop Kumar Rathod
"Chhai Chhap Chhai, Chhapa Ke Chhai" - Lata Mangeshkar, Hariharan
"Ghapla Hai, Ghapla Hai, Ghapla Hai Bhai" - Roop Kumar Rathod
"Jago Jago Jagte Raho, Jago Jago Jagte Raho" - Roop Kumar Rathod
"Jai Hind Hind, Guru Manter Mera" - Lata Mangeshkar
"Nikla Neem Ke Talese Nikla" - Anuradha Paudwal, Kavita Krishnamurthy, Roop Kumar Rathod
"Ye Ankhe, Ye Num Ankhe" - Lata Mangeshkar

Accolades

References

External links 

1999 films
1990s Hindi-language films
Films featuring a Best Supporting Actress National Film Award-winning performance
Films scored by Vishal Bhardwaj
Films with screenplays by Gulzar
Films directed by Gulzar